Gnags is a Danish rock band from Skjern formed by Peter A. G. Nielsen and his brother Jens G. Nielsen in 1966.

History
The band started playing regularly in 1968 after winning the Danish national championship in "beat music". Their championship title paved the way for the band's first two single recordings, "Eyes and Ears" and "I Can't Talk About It Now". Sven Fenger left the band in 1969, after which Gnags continued as a trio, playing Danish festivals and in Amsterdam.

The band moved to Aarhus in 1971 and joined a commune. There they recorded their first album, Paa Vej, which was released in 1973. The band had financed the album out of their own pockets, and they sold the distribution rights to the record producer and musician Johnny Reimar. Struggling to find a record label, Gnags created Genlyd Records in 1974. Ivan Oehlenschaeg Sørensen joined the band in 1973 and Per Christian Frost in 1974. Gnags released their second album, Del af en ring, in 1974.

Gnags created Feedback Studios in 1975, from which most of their subsequent works have been recorded.

Gnags' sales and popularity rose steadily during the 1970s reaching national saturation in the 1980s with albums such as Intercity, Safari and X.

Gnags continues to play and tour after 40 years as a band. Though some members have left over time, the band has maintained a stable membership over the years with only Per Christian Frost, Henning Stærk and Jens G Nielsen leaving in recent history.

In August 2013 the original band members reunited for a concert also celebrating the coincident birthdays of Peter Nielsen (60) and his son (40).

In September 2013, Peter Nielsen began performing a solo performance show.

Music style 
Gnags' musical style is unusual. It is clearly rock and roll but stylistically it is dominated by Peter A. G. Nielsen's unmistakable voice. From 1981 to 1983 there was a strong influence from reggae music, which has its origins in their work with producer Jack Nuber. Gnags have recorded almost all their songs in the Danish language. Exceptions are three songs in English: Their singles "Eyes and Ears" and "I Can't Talk About It Now", and the last track on the 1982 album Safari ("American Boy"). Gnags are energetic performers on stage.

Discography

Albums 
 På vej (1973) Philips
 Del af en ring (1975) Genlyd
 Det er det (1976) Genlyd
 La' det gro (1977) Genlyd
 Er du hjemme i aften? (1978) Genlyd
 Burhøns (1979) Genlyd
 Intercity (1980) Genlyd
 Live Vol. 1 (1981 - live recording) Genlyd
 Safari (1982) Genlyd
 X (1983) Genlyd
 Den blå hund (1984) Genlyd
 En underlig fisk (1985) Genlyd
 Plads til begejstring (1986) Genlyd
 Har de puttet noget i kaffen? (1987) Genlyd
 Under bøgen (1988 - Compilation) Genlyd
 Mr. Swing King (1989) Genlyd
 Lygtemandens sang (1991) Genlyd
 Live vol. 2 (1992 - Live recording) Genlyd
 Øjne på stilke (1994) Genlyd
 Gösta Hammerfedt (1996) Genlyd
 Gnags Greatest (1999 - Compilation) Genlyd
 Ridser, Revner og Buler (2000) Genlyd
 Skønhedspletter (2002) Genlyd
 Skitsernes Drøm (2003) Genlyd
 Siden 66 (2005 - Compilation - Box set) Genlyd
 Legepladsen (2008) Genlyd
 Nørd (2017) Sony Music
 Robot’n'Roll (2019) Sony Music
 På ryggen af en drøm (2022) Sony Music

References

External links

https://web.archive.org/web/20080825023136/http://www.genlyd.dk/

List of Releases: 

Danish rock music groups
People from Ringkøbing-Skjern Municipality
People from Aarhus